Congruence may refer to:

Mathematics
 Congruence (geometry), being the same size and shape
 Congruence or congruence relation, in abstract algebra, an equivalence relation on an algebraic structure that is compatible with the structure
 In modular arithmetic, having the same remainder when divided by a specified integer
Ramanujan's congruences, congruences for the partition function, first discovered by Ramanujan in 1919
Congruence subgroup, a subgroup defined by congruence conditions on the entries of a matrix group with integer entries
Congruence of squares, in number theory, a congruence commonly used in integer factorization algorithms
 Matrix congruence, an equivalence relation between two matrices
 Congruence (manifolds), in the theory of smooth manifolds, the set of integral curves defined by a nonvanishing vector field defined on the manifold
 Congruence (general relativity), in general relativity, a congruence in a four-dimensional Lorentzian manifold that is interpreted physically as a model of space time, or a bundle of world lines
 Zeller's congruence, an algorithm to calculate the day of the week for any date
 Scissors congruence, related to Hilbert's third problem

Mineralogy and chemistry
In mineralogy and chemistry, the term congruent (or incongruent) may refer to: 

 Congruent dissolution: substances dissolve congruently when the composition of the solid and the dissolved solute stoichiometrically match
 Congruent melting occurs during melting of a compound when the composition of the liquid that forms is the same as the composition of the solid
 Incongruent transition, in chemistry, is a mass transition between two phases which involves a change in chemical composition

Psychology
 In Carl Rogers' personality theory, the compliance between ideal self and actual self-see Carl Rogers#Incongruence
 Mood congruence between feeling or emotion (in psychiatry and psychology)
 Incongruity theory of humor

See also 
 Congruence bias, a type of cognitive bias, similar to confirmation bias
 Congruence principle (disambiguation)
 Hatch mark, geometric notation for congruent line segments
 ≅
 ≡ (disambiguation)
 ≃